Ayça Bingöl (born 16 January 1975) is a Turkish actress. She graduated from the Theatre Department at the Istanbul University State Conservatory in 1998.

Career 
Bingöl graduated from Istanbul University State Conservatory in 1998 with a degree in theatre studies. In 1996, she began working at Dormen Theatre as a professional actress, and between 1998 and 2000 she made guest appearances on the stage of Tiyatro Fora. Bingöl continued her career by taking part in commercials, TV series, as well as voice acting. She later joined the theatre organization Yeditepe Oyuncuları. Between 2007 and 2008, she had a part in the play Bana Bir Picasso Gerek, shown at Duru Theatre. During 2008–2009, she performed on stage as a cast member for the play Nehrin Solgun Yüzü. Her performance in the TV series Öyle Bir Geçer Zaman ki earned her a Golden Butterfly Award for Best Actress in 2011. In 2014, she had a leading role in the movie Benim Dünyam.

Filmography

Awards

References

External links 
 
 

Turkish stage actresses
Turkish film actresses
Turkish television actresses
1975 births
Turkish voice actresses
Living people
Actresses from Istanbul